This is a list of members of the fourth parliament of the South Australian House of Assembly, which sat from 31 March 1865 until 26 March 1868. The members were elected at the 1865 colonial election.

Notes
 Noarlunga MHA William Trimmer had been elected on a technicality after return from one polling place was declared invalid. He resigned at the first sitting, leaving John Carr as the duly elected member.
 Light MHA Francis Dutton accepted the office of South Australia's Agent General in London on 29 September 1865. John Rounsevell won the resulting by-election on 12 October, but his seat was declared vacant on 16 November. He then won a second by-election on 27 November.
 Port Adelaide MHA John Hart resigned on 28 March 1866. Jacob Smith won the resulting by-election on 29 June.
 Flinders MHA Alfred Watts resigned on 15 September 1866. Augustine Stow won the resulting by-election on 20 October.
 The Burra MHA George Cole resigned on 28 September 1866. Alexander McCulloch won the resulting by-election on 15 October.
 Victoria MHA Adam Lindsay Gordon resigned on 10 November 1866. James Umpherston won the resulting by-election on 13 December.
 East Torrens MHA Charles Goode resigned on 22 November 1866. Randolph Isham Stow won the resulting by-election on 3 December.
 Gumeracha MHA Alexander Borthwick Murray resigned on 27 June 1867. Alexander Hay won the resulting by-election on 15 July.
 East Torrens MHA Neville Blyth resigned on 9 July 1867. Daniel Fisher won the resulting by-election on 22 July.
 The Sturt MHA Joseph Peacock died on 25 July 1867. Alexander Murray won the resulting by-election on 14 August.

References
Statistical Record of the Legislature 1836-2007, Parliament of SA, www.parliament.sa.gov.au

Members of South Australian parliaments by term
19th-century Australian politicians